Sij or SIJ may refer to:

 Sacroiliac joint
 Special Immigrant Juvenile Status
 Sij, Gilan, a village in Iran
 Sij, Razavi Khorasan, a village in Iran
 Sij, South Khorasan, a village in Iran